Myoporum crassifolium is a plant in the figwort family, Scrophulariaceae. It is a shrub or small tree with thick, fleshy leaves and small groups of white flowers spotted with pink or purple. It is endemic to New Caledonia, Vanuatu and the Loyalty Islands and is a rich source of the essential oil, bisabolol.

Description
They are elliptic to egg-shaped, sometimes with the narrower end towards the base, shiny on both surfaces with the mid-vein more prominent on the lower surface.

The flowers are arranged in groups of 3 to 6 in the axils of the leaves and have 5 sepals and 5 white, spotted pink petals joined at their base to form a tube. There are 4 stamens which extend slightly beyond the petals.

Taxonomy and naming
Myoporum crassifolium was first formally described in 1786 by Georg Forster in Florulae Insularum Australium Prodromus. The specific epithet (crassifolium) means "thick-leaved".

Distribution and habitat
Myoporum crassifolium occurs in New Caledonia including the Loyalty Islands and on Efate and Aneityum islands in Vanuatu. It grows in shrubland and on rocky areas behind beaches.

Conservation
Myoporum crassifolium is classified as "not threatened".

Uses

Essential oils
On the L'Île-des-Pins, this species is an ingredient of a medicinal preparation and inner parts of the branches can be used as torches, burning with a white light and producing a pleasant scent.
More than 80% of the essential oil extracted from Myoporum crassifolium is bisabolol.

References

crassifolium
Flora of New Caledonia
Flora of Vanuatu
Lamiales of Australia
Plants described in 1786